The vitamin E family comprise four tocotrienols (alpha, beta, gamma, delta) and four tocopherols (alpha, beta, gamma, delta). The critical chemical structural difference between tocotrienols and tocopherols is that tocotrienols have unsaturated isoprenoid side chains with three carbon-carbon double bonds versus saturated side chains for tocopherols (see Figure).

Tocotrienols are compounds naturally occurring at higher levels in some vegetable oils, including palm oil, rice bran oil, wheat germ, barley, saw palmetto, annatto, and certain other types of seeds, nuts and grains, and the oils derived from them.

Chemically, different analogues of vitamin E all show some activity as a chemical antioxidant, but do not all have the same vitamin E equivalence. Tocotrienols demonstrate activity depending on the type of antioxidant performance being measured.  All tocotrienols have some physical antioxidant activity due to an ability to donate a hydrogen atom (a proton plus electron) from the hydroxyl group on the chromanol ring, to free radical and reactive oxygen species. Historically studies of tocotrienols account for less than 1% of all research into vitamin E. A scientific compilation of tocotrienol research, Tocotrienols: Vitamin E Beyond Tocopherols, was published in 2013.

Health effects
A number of health benefits of tocotrienols have been proposed, included decreased risk of heart disease and cancer. The Food and Nutrition Board of the Institute of Medicine of the United States National Academy of Sciences does not define a Recommended Dietary Allowance or Adequate Intake for tocotrienols.

Brain
A review of human studies in middle-aged and elderly stated "Evidence from prospective and case-control studies suggested that increased blood levels of tocotrienols were associated with favorable cognitive function outcomes." The review qualified this statement by noting that randomized, controlled clinical trials were needed to evaluate these observations.

Heart disease
Tocotrienols have been linked to improved markers of heart disease.

Side effects
Tocotrienols are generally well tolerated and without significant side effects.

History
The discovery of tocotrienols was first reported by Pennock and Whittle in 1964, describing the isolation of tocotrienols from rubber.  The biological significance of tocotrienols was clearly delineated in the early 1980s, when its ability to lower cholesterol was first reported by Qureshi and Elson in the Journal of Medicinal Chemistry. During the 1990s, the anti-cancer properties of tocopherols and tocotrienols began to be delineated. The current commercial sources of tocotrienol are rice and palm. Other natural tocotrienol sources include rice bran oil, coconut oil, cocoa butter, barley, and wheat germ. Tocotrienols are safe and human studies show no adverse effects with consumption of 240 mg/day for 48 months. Tocotrienol rich fractions from rice, palm, or annatto, used in nutritional supplements, functional foods, and anti-aging cosmetics, are available in the market at 20%, 35%, 50%, and 70% total vitamin E content.

Etymology
Tocotrienols are named by analogy to tocopherols (from Greek words meaning to bear a pregnancy (see tocopherol); but with this word changed to include the chemical difference that tocotrienols are trienes, meaning that they share identical structure with the tocopherols except for the addition of the three double bonds to their side chains.

Comparison to tocopherols
Tocotrienols have only a single chiral center—the 2' carbon on the chromanol ring, which is where the isoprenoid tail is attached. Unlike the tocopherols, which have additional chiral centers along their saturated tail chain, the unsaturated chain of the tocotrienols instead have double-bonds at this sites. Tocotrienols extracted from plants are always dextrorotatory stereoisomers, signified as d-tocotrienols. In theory, (levorotatory; l-tocotrienol) forms of tocotrienols could exist as well, which would have a 2S rather than 2R configuration at the molecules' single chiral center, but unlike synthetic, dl-alpha-tocopherol, the marketed tocotrienol dietary supplements are all d-tocotrienol extracts from palm or annatto oils.

Tocotrienol studies confirm anti-oxidation, anti-inflammatory potentials and suggest anti-cancer effects better than the common forms of tocopherol due to their chemical structure. Scientists have suggested tocotrienols are better antioxidants than tocopherols. It has been proposed that the unsaturated side-chain in tocotrienols causes them to penetrate tissues with saturated fatty layers more efficiently than tocopherol. Lipid ORAC values are highest for δ-tocotrienol. However that study also says: "Regarding α-tocopherol equivalent antioxidant capacity, no significant differences in the antioxidant activity of all vitamin E isoforms were found."

Metabolism and bioavailability 
The metabolism and thus the bioavailability of tocotrienols are not well understood and simply increasing the intake of tocotrienols might not increase tocotrienol levels in the body.

α-Tocopherol interference 
Various studies have shown that alpha-tocopherol interferes with tocotrienol benefits.  High levels of α-tocopherol increase cholesterol production.
α-Tocopherol interference with tocotrienol absorption was described previously by scientists, who showed that α-tococopherol interfered with absorption of α-tocotrienol, but not γ-tocotrienol. Finally, α-tocopherol was shown to interfere with tocotrienols by increasing catabolism.

Sources 
In nature, tocotrienols are present in many plants and fruits. The oil palm fruit (Elaeis guineensis) is particularly high in tocotrienols, primarily gamma-tocotrienol, alpha-tocotrienol and delta-tocotrienol. Other cultivated plants high in tocotrienols includes rice, wheat, barley, rye and oat.

Research

Radiation countermeasures
Following exposure to gamma radiation, hematopoietic stem cells (HSCs) in the bone marrow, which are important for producing blood cells, rapidly undergo apoptosis (cell death). There are no known treatments for this acute effect of radiation. Two studies conducted by the U.S. Armed Forces Radiobiology Research Institute (AFRRI) found that treatment with γ-tocotrienol or δ-tocotrienol enhanced survival of hematopoietic stem cells, which are essential for renewing the body's supply of blood cells. Based on these successful results of studies in mice, γ-tocotrienol is being studied for its safety and efficacy as a radioprotective measure in nonhuman primates. No human trials have yet been completed.

References

External links 
Vitamin E factsheet — Office of Dietary Supplements, National Institutes of Health
 
 

Vitamers
Vitamin E